Lt. Tony Rodriguez is a fictional character in the television series NYPD Blue, and was played by Esai Morales for 66 episodes from 2001-2004.

Biography
Rodriguez was assigned as 15th squad commander after the detectives all but rebelled against Lt. Arthur Fancy's unpopular replacement, Lt. Susan Dalto.  Fancy called in one last favor from Captain Bass and had Dalto transferred out - and Rodriguez transferred in.

Rodriguez had previously been a part of the narcotics squad where he had been a successful undercover officer; the squad (except for Andy) became excited that their new boss was a "living legend". Andy was initially scornful, with their differences coming largely from the fact that Rodriguez was far more hands on than any of the other leaders the squad had experienced.  When Rodriguez overrode Andy and intervened in a case, Andy reminded him that being a boss was different than being a detective, which Rodriguez accepted as fair criticism.  Andy's disputes with Rodriguez were generally addressed very quickly and it was clear there was a lot of mutual respect between the two men.

Tony's past in Narcotics came back to haunt him when a vengeful dealer he'd put in jail got out and attacked Tony's mom.  Tony steamrolled the other cops working the case and eventually forced the criminal to confess to his new crime at gunpoint - a fact he lied about at the criminal's trial.

In Season 10, Tony reconnected with his ex-wife, who had left him when she was addicted to drugs. Though she initially claimed to be clean and Tony adamantly ignored reality to defend her, he discovered she was using again and demanded she seek treatment. She ended up fleeing again and was later found dead of an overdose. Tony initially demanded a homicide investigation, and angrily accused a man who was also an ex-husband of being involved in the death.  The facts eventually became clear, and Tony faced the reality of her self-inflicted demise.

Tony had a professional problem with Captain Fraker, an Internal Affairs investigator who carried a grudge against Tony and tried to have him fired.  Fraker's machinations nearly cost Tony his command in season 9, but Andy shut down Fraker's vendetta by threatening to reveal that Fraker was having an affair with one of his female subordinates.

Word of Fraker's corruption eventually got out.  After his dirty dealings were exposed and his career and marriage were ruined, he blamed Tony.  After a late night confrontation in Tony's office, Fraker suddenly shot him; Fraker moved to fire again, but Det. Rita Ortiz shot Fraker and prevented him from killing Tony.  Fraker was acquitted of attempted murder thanks to an underhanded defense by lawyer James Sinclair.  Tony was subsequently passed over for promotion to captain and decided to retire from the police and take a lucrative job as head of site security for a real estate development company.

Although Tony and Rita began a personal relationship at about the time he left the squad, Rita indicated in season 12 they were no longer dating.  After leaving the police, Rodriguez was replaced as squad commander by Sgt. Eddie Gibson, who had passed the sergeant's exam after treatment for cancer and received the command because there weren't enough lieutenants on the force after the 9-11 attacks (which were referenced on the show).

Fictional New York City Police Department detectives
NYPD Blue characters
Television characters introduced in 2001